Sardent is a commune in the Creuse department in the Nouvelle-Aquitaine region in central France.

Geography

Population

Sights
 The church, dating from the eleventh century.
 Megaliths known as "Les Pierres Boutelines".
 A nineteenth-century chapel at the hamlet of Saint-Pardoux.
 A statue of the "marmot de la Feyte", at La Feyte.
 Sculptures at the village of Mont.

Personalities
Claude Chabrol, (1930-2010), a native of Sardent, shot his first film Le Beau Serge in Sardent
 Eugene Jamot, (1879-1937), doctor of tropical medicine, was born here.

See also
Communes of the Creuse department

References

External links

 Website about Dr.Jamot

Communes of Creuse